Natalin  is a village in the administrative district of Gmina Urzędów, within Kraśnik County, Lublin Voivodeship, in eastern Poland.

References

Villages in Kraśnik County